Trailblazer was a technology demonstration satellite, which was to have been operated by the United States Air Force and the Missile Defense Agency. It was selected for launch under a "Jumpstart" contract, to demonstrate responsiveness, with the final payload being chosen less than a month ahead of the scheduled launch date, and was launched as the primary payload of the third Falcon 1, which failed just over two minutes after launch on 3 August 2008. Two previous Falcon 1 launches also failed to reach orbit, but the fourth succeeded although it only carried a dummy payload.

It was originally built for a canceled MDA project, and was based on a SpaceDev MMB-100 satellite bus. It was launched from Omelek Island, Kwajalein Atoll at 03:34 UTC. Several other payloads were to be launched aboard the same launch vehicle, including two CubeSats for NASA (PRESat and NanoSail-D), and a space burial (Celestis-07) payload for Celestis, which would have remained attached to the launch vehicle in low Earth orbit.

References 

 Gunter's Space Page - Trailblazer
 SpaceX Falcon Rocket: Third Flight the Charm?
 Trailblazer

Satellite launch failures
Spacecraft launched in 2008
SpaceX military payloads